Gurban Mammadov ( (also Məmmədli); born April 2, 1959) is an Azerbaijani politician. He was born in the village of Jahri (Azerb.: Cəhri) of Babek (Azerb.: Babək) district of Nakhchivan (Azerb.: Azərbaycan) Autonomous Republic. He received his education in Ordubad and later graduated from Azerbaijan State University, in Baku. After completing his studies, Mammadov worked as a lawyer for 35 years and played a significant role in Azerbaijani politics. He is known for his outspoken nature and willingness to speak out against the government.

Life 
Mr Mammadov also one of the famous people in Azerbaijan, who helped to form the political movement back in the 1980s to 1990s, was a very close friend and supporter of the first legal / elected president of Azerbaijan - Abulfaz Elchibey. Mr Mammadov also helped him during his presidency and provided the necessary support required to form the constitution and legal system of Azerbaijan. He founded an independent newspaper known as "HURRIYYET" and was CEO from 1990 until 2003.

Politics 

A well-known lawyer in Azerbaijan, Mammadov dealt with human rights cases as the head of Chalkhan LLC, and as an independent attorney. As of early 2013, Mammadov began to seriously criticize the ruling regime and its policies, and became a member of the National Council, a coalition of opposition parties and civil society organizations, formed ahead of the October 2013 presidential election. Mammadov was accused of causing an automobile accident in 2012 that resulted in an injury to a parking lot guard. Mammadov was sentenced to pre-trial detention without sufficient cause. In the third month of his detention, another charge was brought against him. On 6 December 2013, Nasimi District Court sentenced Mammadov to three years in prison. Although all testimonies and evidence including the evidence collected by investigation officers proved Mammadov’s innocence, the court ruling was solely based on the testimony of former police officer, Isa Mansurov, one of the case witnesses. Mansurov claimed that Mammadov’s car had run over the guard’s foot. But when questioned by the lawyers and Mammadov about the accident, he gave answers such as “I don’t remember”.

The court refused to look at the footage recorded by surveillance camera No. TS3-098, which was three or four meters away from the scene of the accident. The court also refused to investigate other circumstances that could have impacted the case. Although none of the articles Mammadov was charged with carrying three-year prison sentences, the court granted the public prosecutor’s request for this duration.

It is not the first politically motivated arrest of Mr Gurban Mammadov. Previously, he was arrested in 1998 and charged with allegations that he plotted the so-called "assassination" of the president Haydar Aliyev, was sentenced to 5 years in prison.

Azerbaijan's president approves amnesty for 87 prisoners on 29 December 2014 and Mr Gurban Mammadov is among them. Mr Mammadov was released from prison on 30 December 2014.

On the 2 April 2018, Mr Gurban Mammadov fled Azerbaijan because of an imminent threat to his life and arrived in the United Kingdom with a five-year family (private) visa which he obtained a year earlier.

He claimed asylum in May the same year once he made a visit to Turkey to meet his wife, receiving a death threat message sent to him via his wife, Mr Mammadov made the decision to immediately return to the UK and apply for asylum.

He was granted full protection on grounds of European Convention on Human Rights and UNHCR - The 1951 Refugee Convention) in 2018, October. 

Presently Mr Gurban Mammadov living in the United Kingdom.

Gurban Mammadov is the founder of AzerFreedom TV, an online television and media group based in the United Kingdom. Mammadov founded the group in 2011, but has been actively managing it since May 2018. Since that time, he has been regularly active on nine different social media platforms, and has had a significant impact on the political environment in Azerbaijan.

In early September 2020, the demolition of the building, made of two offices on the ground floor and three flats above, one of them belonging to Mr Gurban Mammadov and others to his daughters, Gunel Mammadova and Turan Hagverdiyeva, were declared illegal by some unknown people came to the site with up to 30 workers of the local authority, none of them produced identification about who they are and they were accompanied by official police officers, also making no comment about their orders (where local authorities couldn't produce a court order for doing so still to date), located at 4-6 Murtuza Nagiyev Street, Narimanov District of Baku, began. All items within the building were savagely destroyed & looted, while there were 5 under the age of 10 children in those apartments at the time of this vandalism.

There are many video materials on YouTube & Facebook clearly showing the destruction they've caused.

On September 8, 2020, the Prosecutor General's Office of the Republic of Azerbaijan made a decision on declaring Gurban Mammadov internationally wanted and sent the order to the Ministry of Internal Affairs, the State Security Service, as well as the Interpol for execution. He will be sentenced to up to eight years in prison if detained by the Azerbaijani law enforcement agencies.

On March 30th, 2021 US State Department has released its "2020 Country Reports on Human Rights Practices: Azerbaijan" report and in the category of "POLITICALLY MOTIVATED REPRISAL AGAINST INDIVIDUALS LOCATED OUTSIDE THE COUNTRY", Mr Gurban Mammadov's name is listed as one of the main people who is targeted by Azerbaijani authorities, by creating false criminal cases against him, which aims at "to detain foreign residents who are political activists".

Tartar case, also known as "Tartar Treason" (on social media: #Tərtər1767, in azerbaijani: Tərtər işi) 
In the Tartar region of Azerbaijan, the "Tartar case" refers to instances of mass torture that occurred in May-June 2017. According to a joint statement issued by the State Security Service of Azerbaijan, the Ministry of Defense, and the Ministry of Internal Affairs, servicemen were detained and accused of spying for the Armenian special services. No names were provided in the statement, and all official information on the matter has been limited to this.

As of September 5th, 2022, the General Prosecutor of Azerbaijan, Khanlar Valiyev, revealed that 288 more individuals, who were subjected to torture and other illegal acts connected to the Tartar treason case, have been identified and fully interviewed about the circumstances of the case. This brings the total number of identified victims of torture and abuse in the Tartar treason case to 405 Azerbaijani soldiers.

As the result of a recent government investigation, numerous arrests have been made and many additional victims have received official recognition. However, the motivations behind the initiation of the Tartar case, which involved accusations of widespread espionage within the military, remain shrouded in mystery.

Gurban Mammadov, through his work with AzerFreedom TV, conducted a public investigation into the "Tartar case," resulting in the successful release of 19 prisoners and the withdrawal of all criminal charges from their records. This marked a significant achievement for AzerFreedom TV and a personal triumph for Mammadov.

Through his work with AzerFreedom TV, Gurban Mammadov, with the assistance of Ilham Aslanoglu, Abid Gafarov, Avaz Zeynalli, and Azerbaijani political observer and security expert Arastun Orujlu, conducted a thorough investigation into the "Tartar case." This investigation ultimately resulted in the release of 19 prisoners and the dismissal of all criminal charges against them, despite their wrongful detention on false accusations by those in the government who were responsible for the "Tartar case." This was a significant achievement for Mammadov and his team at AzerFreedom TV.

The investigation and resolution of the "Tartar case" was made possible through the efforts of several individuals, to name a few, including lawyer Ilham Aslanoglu, who personally interviewed hundreds of victims and gathered substantial evidentiary materials; Abid Gafarov, who joined the investigation later on and assisted with interviews on "Kim TV" channel on YouTube; Ali Aliyev, chairman of "Citizens and Development Party", known for openly criticizing the government; and Avaz Zeynalli, a freelance journalist and owner of the "Xural TV" YouTube channel, who also contributed to the investigation by conducting interviews with victims and suspects. Unfortunately, all of these individuals were falsely accused and detained, but their dedicated efforts ultimately led to the successful resolution of the "Tartar case.

On June 9, 2022, Ilham Aslanoglu (Tahmazov), a lawyer and activist who had been actively involved in the public investigation of the "Tartar case," was sentenced to six months in prison by the Yevlakh region court. Aslanoglu was convicted under Article 148 (insult) of the Criminal Code. Previously, Aslanoglu had already been convicted due to the Terter case allegations. On January 28, the Yevlakh region court found him guilty under Article 147.2 (slander of a felony) and sentenced him to five months of imprisonment.

Activist Abid Gafarov was imprisoned for 1 year by a local court. This happened despite the applicants’ withdrawal of their claim. Two human rights organizations immediately issued a statement condemning the court decision. According to human rights activists, the arrest of Gafarov is a political order.

Journalist, the head of "Xural TV" Avaz Zeynalli was initially sentenced to 4 months of preventive detention but his detention was again extended for another 3 months.

On January 13 of 2022,  Ali Aliyev - chairman of Citizens and Development Party was sentenced to 5 months in prison on charges of libel (Article 147.1 of the Criminal Code) based on a complaint by an officer of the State Border Service (SBS) Emil Jafarov.

Family 
Mammadov is married and has five children:

 Goshgar Mammadov (sought political asylum from United Kingdom of Great Britain and Northern Ireland in 2004 and was granted full protection on grounds of European Convention on Human Rights & UNHCR - The 1951 Refugee Convention). Married and has four children. Mr Goshgar Mammadov is following his father's footsteps and already known by the public in Azerbaijan, his interview with "Radio Freedom Europe" made him wellknown in Azerbaijan, as his father-in-law was detained the next morning and forced to resign from the Ministry of Taxes of Azerbaijan Republic, where he worked for more than 17 years.
 Turan Mammadova
 Gunel Mammadova
 Elnur Mammadov
 Chalkhan Mammadli (Mammadov) fled Azerbaijan, to escape unlawful prosecution by the government officials in March 2016. He sought asylum from Spain and was granted full protection on grounds of European Convention on Human Rights & UNHCR - The 1951 Refugee Convention). Married and has a son. Mr Chalkhan Mammadli was targeted for his employment, providing reporting/journalism services to opposition newspapers and online televisions. He was responsible for collecting and providing video/audio materials to the media bodies. His partnership got exposed, hence the persecution began.

References

1959 births
Living people